Olshukovskaya is a rural locality (a village) in Vozhegodskoye Urban Settlement, Vozhegodsky District, Vologda Oblast, Russia. The population was 39 as of 2002.

Geography 
Olshukovskaya is located 12 km southwest of Vozhega (the district's administrative centre) by road. Malaya Klimovskaya is the nearest rural locality.

References 

Rural localities in Vozhegodsky District